The Ice Bowl was a college football game held in Fairbanks, Alaska between 1948 and 1952 and contested by the University of Alaska Fairbanks football team and a team from the Ladd Air Force Base.

The game took place in the first week of January, around the same time as the major bowl games in the Continental United States.

The series featured two scoreless tie games and a win apiece for each team before being discontinued in 1952, as interest in football at UAF began to decline in the early 1950s, with the school devoting its athletic resources to more "northern" sports such as ice hockey and skiing.

Game result

Italics denote a tie game.

See also
List of the first college football game in each US state

External links
 Game Results 
 Article on the game

1949 in sports in Alaska
1950 in sports in Alaska
1951 in sports in Alaska
1952 in sports in Alaska
American football in Alaska
Annual events in Alaska
Defunct college football bowls
Alaska Nanooks football
1949 establishments in Alaska
1952 disestablishments in Alaska
Recurring sporting events established in 1949
Recurring sporting events disestablished in 1952